Hochmair is a surname. Notable people with the surname include:

Erwin Hochmair (born 1940), Austrian electrical engineer
Ingeborg Hochmair (born 1953), Austrian electrical engineer
Philipp Hochmair (born 1973), Austrian actor

Surnames of Austrian origin